Deplorothrips is a genus of thrips in the family Phlaeothripidae.

Species
 Deplorothrips acutus
 Deplorothrips armatus
 Deplorothrips bassus
 Deplorothrips belliatus
 Deplorothrips capitalis
 Deplorothrips cephalicus
 Deplorothrips chydaeus
 Deplorothrips deuae
 Deplorothrips diaphorus
 Deplorothrips howei
 Deplorothrips makrus
 Deplorothrips medius
 Deplorothrips minaei
 Deplorothrips mongai
 Deplorothrips norfuki
 Deplorothrips opacus
 Deplorothrips paspalus
 Deplorothrips regina
 Deplorothrips retis
 Deplorothrips setiger
 Deplorothrips similis
 Deplorothrips villosus
 Deplorothrips virgulatus

References

Phlaeothripidae
Thrips
Thrips genera
Taxa named by Laurence Alfred Mound